Judge Roth may refer to:

Jane Richards Roth (born 1935), judge of the United States Court of Appeals for the Third Circuit
Peter Roth (judge) (born 1952), judge of the High Court of England and Wales
Stephen John Roth (1908–1974), judge of the United States District Court for the Eastern District of Michigan
Stephen L. Roth (fl. 2010s), judge of the Utah Court of Appeals